

Acts of the Northern Ireland Assembly

|-
| {{|Public Service Pensions Act (Northern Ireland) 2014|ania|2|11-03-2014|maintained=y|archived=n|An Act to make provision for public service pension schemes; and for connected purposes.}}
|-
| {{|Budget Act (Northern Ireland) 2014|ania|3|19-03-2014|maintained=y|archived=n|An Act to authorise the issue out of the Consolidated Fund of certain sums for the service of the years ending 31st March 2014 and 2015; to appropriate those sums for specified purposes; to authorise the Department of Finance and Personnel to borrow on the credit of the appropriated sums; to authorise the use for the public service of certain resources for the years ending 31st March 2014 and 2015; and to revise the limits on the use of certain accruing resources in the year ending 31st March 2014.}}
|-
| {{|Tobacco Retailers Act (Northern Ireland) 2014|ania|4|25-03-2014|maintained=y|archived=n|An Act to make provision for a register of tobacco retailers; to make provision for dealing with the persistent commission of tobacco offences; to amend the Health and Personal Social Services (Northern Ireland) Order 1978; to confer additional powers of enforcement in relation to offences under that Order and the Children and Young Persons (Protection from Tobacco) (Northern Ireland) Order 1991; and for connected purposes.}}
|-
| {{|Health and Social Care (Amendment) Act (Northern Ireland) 2014|ania|5|11-04-2014|maintained=y|archived=n|An Act to amend the Health and Social Care (Reform) Act (Northern Ireland) 2009 and to make amendments consequential on that Act.}}
|-
| {{|Financial Provisions Act (Northern Ireland) 2014|ania|6|28-04-2014|maintained=y|archived=n|An Act to repeal the Development Loans (Agriculture and Fisheries) Act (Northern Ireland) 1968; to enable the Department of Agriculture and Rural Development to pay grants to certain harbour authorities; to amend the Rates (Northern Ireland) Order 1977; to make provision in relation to the payment of interest on funds in court; to make provision enabling the Northern Ireland Housing Executive to recover certain costs; to make provision for the disclosure of data obtained by the Comptroller and Auditor General for data matching purposes; to enable the Department of Justice to make payments to certain bodies providing services for the police, etc.; and for purposes connected with those matters.}}
|-
| {{|Carrier Bags Act (Northern Ireland) 2014|ania|7|28-04-2014|maintained=y|archived=n|An Act to amend the Climate Change Act 2008 to confer powers to make provision about charging for carrier bags; to amend the Single Use Carrier Bags Charge Regulations (Northern Ireland) 2013; and for connected purposes.}}
|-
| {{|Local Government Act (Northern Ireland) 2014|ania|8|12-05-2014|maintained=y|archived=n|An Act to amend the law relating to local government.}}
|-
| {{|Licensing of Pavement Cafés Act (Northern Ireland) 2014|ania|9|12-05-2014|maintained=y|archived=n|An Act to make provision for the regulation by district councils of the placing on public areas of furniture for use for the consumption of food or drink.}}
|-
| {{|Budget (No. 2) Act (Northern Ireland) 2014|ania|10|16-07-2014|maintained=y|archived=n|An Act to authorise the issue out of the Consolidated Fund of certain sums for the service of the year ending 31st March 2015; to appropriate those sums for specified purposes; to authorise the Department of Finance and Personnel to borrow on the credit of the appropriated sums; to authorise the use for the public service of certain resources (including accruing resources) for the year ending 31st March 2015; and to repeal certain spent provisions.}}
|-
| {{|Legal Aid and Coroners' Courts Act (Northern Ireland) 2014|ania|11|17-11-2014|maintained=y|archived=n|An Act to dissolve the Northern Ireland Legal Services Commission and provide for the exercise of functions of the Commission by the Department of Justice or the Director of Legal Aid Casework; to amend the law on legal aid in criminal proceedings, civil legal services and criminal defence services; to provide for the Lord Chief Justice to be president of the coroners' courts and for the appointment of a Presiding coroner; and for connected purposes.}}
|-
| {{|Education Act (Northern Ireland) 2014|ania|12|11-12-2014|maintained=y|archived=n|An Act to provide for the establishment and functions of the Education Authority; to confer power on the Department of Education to make grants to sectoral bodies; and for connected purposes.}}
}}

References

2014